Eureka is the third album by Vancouver-based indie rock band Mother Mother. It was produced by band member Ryan Guldemond and mixed by Mike Fraser (AC/DC, Metallica, Aerosmith, Joe Satriani).

Singles
The album's first single, "The Stand", peaked at number 76 on the Canadian Hot 100 music chart. Its second single, "Baby Don't Dance" was the first to be co-written by drummer Ali Siadat. Music videos were released for both singles.

Commercial performance
The album debuted at number 8 on the Canadian Albums Chart selling 3,500 copies.

Track listing

All songs written by Ryan Guldemond, except where noted.

Personnel

Mother Mother
 Ryan Guldemond - guitar, vocals, composer
 Molly Guldemond - vocals, keyboard 
 Jasmin Parkin - keyboard, vocals 
 Jeremy Page - bass
 Ali Siadat - drums, backing vocals

Additional Personnel
 Jesse Zubot - violin 
 Peggy Lee - cello
 Casey Guldemond - backing vocals
 Aaron Nordean - backing vocals
 Shawn Penner - percussion

Production
 Mike Fraser - producer, mixing
 Ryan Guldemond - producer
 Mother Mother - arrangements
 Andy VanDette - mastering
 Shawn Penner - engineer
 Todd Duym - photography
 Molly Guldemond - artwork, design

References

Mother Mother albums
2011 albums